= Pavel Ryaboshapka =

Russian footballer

Personal information
- Full name: Pavel Viktorovich Ryaboshapka
- Date of birth: 25 November 1983 (age 42)
- Height: 1.85 m (6 ft 1 in)
- Positions: Defender; midfielder

Senior career*
Years	Team	Apps	(Gls)
2003–2014	FC Neftekhimik Nizhnekamsk	226	(18)
2014–2015	FC SKA-Energiya Khabarovsk	15	(1)
- * Club domestic league appearances and goals

Pavel Viktorovich Ryaboshapka (Russian: Павел Викторович Рябошапка; born 25 November 1983) is a former Russian professional football player.

== Club career ==
He played 5 seasons in the Russian Football National League for FC Neftekhimik Nizhnekamsk and FC SKA-Energiya Khabarovsk.
